The 1947 NCAA Wrestling Championships were the 17th NCAA Wrestling Championships to be held. The University of Illinois in Champaign, Illinois hosted the tournament at Huff Gymnasium.

Cornell College took home the team championship with 32 points and having two individual champions.

Bill Koll of Iowa State Teachers College was named the Outstanding Wrestler.

Team results

Individual finals

References 

NCAA Division I Wrestling Championship
Wrestling competitions in the United States
1947 in American sports
1947 in sports in Illinois